Antiga fàbrica de pells  is a building located at Avinguda Miquel Mateu, 13–15 in Escaldes, Escaldes-Engordany Parish, Andorra. It is a heritage property registered in the Cultural Heritage of Andorra. It was built in 1946.

References

Escaldes-Engordany
Buildings and structures in Andorra
Buildings and structures completed in 1946
Cultural Heritage of Andorra